State Highway 61 (RJ SH 61) is a State Highway in Rajasthan state of India that connects Phalodi in Jodhpur district of Rajasthan with Mandal in Bhilwara district of Rajasthan. The total length of RJ SH 61 is 349 km. 

This highway connects NH 15 in Phalodi to NH 79 in Mandal. It meets National Highway 65, National Highway 112 and National Highway 114 in Jodhpur, National Highway 14 in Jadan and National Highway 8 in Kamalighat. It also meets RJ SH 68 in Khejrali, RJ SH 67 in Sardarsamand, RJ SH 62 in Jojawar and RJ SH 56 in Devgarh.

Other cities and towns on this highway are: Lordiyan, Lohawat, Osian, Umednagar, Mathania, Jodhpur, Khejrali, Bhatenda, Saradasamand, Jadan, Marwar Junction, Auwa, Jojawar, Kamalighat, Devgarh, Nimbahera Jatan, Rajaji ka kareda, Bemali and Bhagwanpura.

See also
 List of State Highways in Rajasthan
 Roads in Pali district

References
 State Highway

Pali district
Transport in Jodhpur district
Rajsamand district
Bhilwara district
State Highways in Rajasthan